Walker Flat (previously Walkers Flat) is a small town on the Murray River in South Australia. It is one of the crossings of the river by cable ferry. The school opened in 1948 but has since closed.

The Ankara youth camp owned by the Seventh-day Adventist Church is on the bank of the river near the ferry.

See also
List of crossings of the Murray River

Notes

External links

Towns in South Australia
Murray River